General Conway may refer to:

Henry Seymour Conway (1721–1795), British Army general
James T. Conway (born 1947), U.S. Marine Corps four-star general
Michael Conway (British Army officer) (fl. 1980s–2010s), British Army major general
Theodore J. Conway (1909–1990), U.S. Army four-star general
Thomas Conway (1735–c. 1800), Continental Army major general

See also
Attorney General Conway (disambiguation)